KRSC (1400 AM) is a radio station licensed to Othello, Washington, United States.  The station is currently owned by Centro Familiar Cristiano.

References

External links

 

RSC
Regional Mexican radio stations in the United States